Lilydale railway station is the terminus of the suburban electrified Lilydale line in Victoria, Australia. It serves the north-eastern Melbourne suburb of Lilydale, and opened on 1 December 1882 as Lillydale.

History
Lilydale station opened on 1 December 1882 as an extension of the line from Camberwell, which had been extended from Hawthorn in April 1882. The fare from Melbourne was 3s 6d (first class) and 2s 6d (second class), and a letter-writer to The Age newspaper, "Cyclops", claimed that with the fare from Melbourne to Box Hill being only 9d (first class), there would soon be a line of stage coaches waiting to take people to Lillydale, with the extra cost effectively being a check on the growth of the town.

The second station building, opened in 1888, was relocated to Yarra Junction station in 1915, having been replaced by the current building. When the new elevated station was constructed during level crossing elimination works in 2020-2022, the old ground-level building was retained. Its former refreshment rooms are listed on the Victorian Heritage Register.

Until it was truncated at Lilydale in 1980, the line continued to Healesville. The line between Yarra Glen and Healesville is now part of the Yarra Valley Railway. The track from Lilydale to Yarra Glen, including Coldstream and Yering, is being repurposed as a rail trail. The Yarra Valley Railway originally leased the entire line, but they discontinued their lease on the section from Lilydale to Yarra Glen because of the bad condition of the bridges in that section. On 10 December 1991, the line between Lilydale and Coldstream was officially booked out of service.

Also branching off at Lilydale was the Warburton line. It opened in 1901, and closed on 1 August 1965. The track was removed in the early 1970s, as was the bridge over the Maroondah Highway. Most of the right-of-way is still intact, and has been turned into the Lilydale to Warburton Rail Trail. The exception is the part of the line approximately 800 metres beyond where it branched off at Lilydale. Mount Lilydale Mercy College currently leases that part of the railway reserve, which runs through its property, being the only part of the former line that is obstructed.

Until 1967, a turntable also existed at the station.

In 1985, boom barriers replaced hand gates at the former Maroondah Highway level crossing, which was located at the Up end of the station. Also in that year, a signal panel was provided at the station, which controlled Lilydale and Mooroolbark. It was abolished in September 2021, with control transferred to Ringwood.

On 29 November 1991, a Hitachi train set rolled away from the stabling yard for about 1.5km towards Coldstream. It crashed through a wire fence and traversed the Beresford and Nelson Roads level crossings, and was about to climb a hill when it rolled back 300 metres. Police advised that only one of the four brakes on the train was engaged. A train driver was suspended due to the incident.

On 31 July 1996, Lilydale was upgraded to a Premium Station.

In 2015, the Level Crossing Removal Authority announced it was planning the grade separation of the crossing at Maroondah Highway. In 2019, the designs were revealed. Work commenced in 2020, and the level crossing removed was removed in late 2021. The chosen method was to raise the railway line above the former level crossing. As part of the plans, the current Lilydale station building remained where it was, being heritage listed. The rail bridge on John Street was demolished, and the land between it and the level crossing became an activity zone located underneath the new station. On 19 November 2021, the rebuilt Lilydale station reopened.

Platforms and services
Lilydale has one island platform with two faces. It is served by Lilydale line trains.

Platform 1:
  all stations and limited express services to and from Flinders Street; all stations shuttle services to and from Ringwood

Platform 2:
  all stations and limited express services to and from Flinders Street; all stations shuttle services to and from Ringwood

Transport links
Martyrs Bus Service operates one route via Lilydale station, under contract to Public Transport Victoria:
 : Chirnside Park Shopping Centre – Warburton

McKenzie's Tourist Services operates three bus routes via Lilydale station, under contract to Public Transport Victoria:
 : Eildon – Southern Cross station
 : to Healesville
  : to Lilydale station (Healesville Loop Service) (Saturday and Sunday mornings only)

Ventura Bus Lines operates six routes via Lilydale station, under contract to Public Transport Victoria:
 : to Belgrave station
 : Ringwood station – Box Hill Institute Lilydale Lakeside Campus
 : to Chirnside Park Shopping Centre
 : Chirnside Park Shopping Centre – Ringwood station
 : to Mooroolbark station
 

Mee's Bus Lines run a V/Line Coach service from Mansfield to Melbourne via Lilydale station.

Gallery

References

External links
 Melway map at street-directory.com.au

Premium Melbourne railway stations
Railway stations in Melbourne
Railway stations in Australia opened in 1882
Railway stations in the Shire of Yarra Ranges